Friedrich Tete Harens Tetens (T. H. Tetens) was a German journalist and writer. He was born in Berlin in 1899 and imprisoned in Oranienburg concentration camp (1933) before emigrating to Switzerland (1934), Argentina (1936) and finally the United States (1939). He died in 1976. 

Over his career he wrote extensively on subjects related to Nazi Germany and National Socialism. An early advocate of 'harsh peace', he joined the Society for the Prevention of World War III early in 1944, before the leaking of the Morgenthau Plan. This was his last book, though Tetens would live to see the Frankfurt Auschwitz trials of the mid-60's and Brandt's 1969 election and visit to Israel.

Bibliography
Hitlers "Mein Kampf", serially in 10 issues of the Basel National-Zeitung, 1935
 Know Your Enemy,with preface by Emil Ludwig; introduction by Rudolph Fluegge, New York, Society for the Prevention of World War III, inc. [1944]
 Germany Plots with the Kremlin, Henry Schuman publ, New York, 1953. LCCN 53-7200.
The New Germany and the Old Nazis, Random House/Marzani+Munsel, New York, 1961. LCCN 61-7240.

References

See also
History of Germany (1945–1990)
Allied-occupied Germany
Germany–Israel relations

German economists
1899 births
1976 deaths
German emigrants to the United States